Ramsau im Zillertal is a municipality in the Schwaz district in the Austrian state of Tyrol.

Geography
Ramsau lies in the upper Ziller valley east of the Ziller.

References

Cities and towns in Schwaz District